The  (TMS) is a biennial auto show held in October–November at the Tokyo Big Sight, Tokyo, Japan for cars, motorcycles and commercial vehicles. Hosted by the Japan Automobile Manufacturers Association (JAMA), it is a recognized international show by the Organisation Internationale des Constructeurs d'Automobiles, and normally sees more concept cars than actual production car introductions which is the reason why the auto press see the show as one of the motorshow's big five (along with Detroit, Geneva, Frankfurt and Paris).

For the first time in its 67-year history, the Tokyo Motor Show was cancelled for 2021 due to rising cases of COVID-19.

History

The show, originally called All Japan Motor Show was first held in an outdoor venue called Hibiya Park, the show was considered a success with 547,000 visitors over ten days and 254 exhibitors displaying 267 vehicles, but of the 267, only 17 of them were passenger cars as the show was dominated by commercial vehicles. In 1958, due to construction of a subway and underground parking lot near Hibiya Park, the show was shifted to the Korakuen Bicycle Racing Track. The show changed venues again in 1959 as the previous year was marred by heavy rain. It moved to an indoor facility, the newly opened Harumi Showplace which was three times the size of its previous venue. The 1962 show attracted more than 1 million visitors to view 410 vehicles from 284 exhibitors.

Starting in 1973, the organisers decided to suspend the 1974 show due to the international energy crisis and the show became a biennial event. The show relocated to the convention and exhibition center Makuhari Messe in 1989, then its current venue Tokyo Big Sight in 2011. Due to high public demand for vehicles in everyday use and the fact that concept cars dominate the show, the show returned to being an annual event from 2001 to 2005 with a show for passenger cars and motorcycle in odd-numbered years and smaller shows for commercial vehicles in 2002 and 2004. However, from 2007 onwards the event has once again returned to a biennial schedule which combines both passenger and commercial vehicles, including motorcycles and auto parts.

After several consecutive events with declining attendance, the 2019 Tokyo Motor Show recorded almost double the attendance of the 2017 event, which was attributed to expanding the scope beyond automobiles. The 2021 event was cancelled due to the ongoing COVID-19 pandemic, The planned 2023 event will include other automobile-related industries and has been rebranded to the Japan Mobility Show.

By year

1950s

1954 
The first Tokyo Motor Show was held in Hibiya Park from April 20 to April 29, 1954. Of the 267 vehicles on display, only seventeen were passenger cars, which reflected the paucity of personal family transport in Japan at the time. Trucks, buses, and motorcycles made up most of the exhibits. Approximately 547,000 visitors attended the show over the ten days, where the most prominent cars were the Austin A40, Hillman Minx and the newly introduced Renault 4CV, as well as domestic vehicles such as the Prince Sedan AISH, Toyota Toyopet Super RH; Datsun Passenger Delux (Model DB-5), Ohta Sedan and Van, and three-wheeled vehicles from Daihatsu.

1955 

The second Tokyo Motor Show was held over twelve days, from May 7 to May 18, 1955. Almost 785,000 visitors attended, among them HIH Prince Akihito. The highlights of the passenger cars on display were the new Datsun 110, Toyopet Crown RS and Toyopet Master RR.

The Second All-Japan Motor Show was held in 1955 at Hibiya Park, the same venue as the previous year. The show was extended to 12 days. Exhibitors still focused on commercial vehicles, such as trucks, that year. Notably, in the light-duty truck category, advanced models were displayed, including Toyota's 4-wheel light truck SKB (1,000cc engine) which will be renamed as Toyoace in 1956, Nissan's Datsun 120 Truck and Fuji Seimitsu's 1.5-ton class 4-wheel truck. These models featured both excellent driving performance and handling stability that well outperform conventional 3-wheel light trucks.

New passenger cars also were presented on the motor show's stages. Toyota unveiled its 1.5-liter engine class small cars such as Toyopet Crown and Toyopet Master, while Nissan's Datsun 110 (860cc engine) also made its debut. These cars were signs of the start of the motorization of Japanese society with made-in-Japan brands. Meanwhile, the Imperial Prince visited the motor show for the first time.

1956 
Passenger cars began to assume the greatest prominence at the third Tokyo Motor Show which opened on April 20, 1956, over a 10-day period at Hibiya Park. This was primarily due to an initiative spearheaded by the Ministry of International Trade and Industry called the "people's car plan" or the "National Car Project", announced in May 1955.

From this year, exhibited products have been grouped by vehicle type - truck, pickup truck, passenger car, 2-wheeler, and motorcycle. This measure was taken to provide more merits for visitors because the majority of them were particularly interested in passenger cars. A poster of the motor show carried the slogan "Japanese Automobiles at a Glance!" 

The Japanese government also had planned to release the national car at an affordable price range of around 250,000 yen. At that time, passenger cars were still very expensive for the general public in reality. At the same time, they had a premonition that the "passenger cars" they dreamt of would gradually be getting closer to their lives. Passenger cars became the boom of the motor show, accordingly.

1957 
Although only 527,000 people visited the fourth show between May 9 and May 19, 1957, significant vehicles made their debut; the first of the long running Toyota Corona and Prince Skyline were introduced, as well as a prototype of the Datsun Sports.

The Fourth All-Japan Motor Show was held at Hibiya Park during an 11-day period from May 9. In the passenger car category, a significant improvement was found in the quality of exhibited vehicles, including the first-generation Toyopet Corona small car, Fuji Seimitsu's Prince Skyline, and the Nissan Datsun Sport prototype. In the truck category, Toyota displayed its first diesel truck (DA60), while Nissan unveiled its Nissan Junior and Nissan 581 models. Ohta also exhibited its 1.5-ton class light truck model. Meanwhile, an automobile information bureau was newly set up in the PR Center to provide extended knowledge on road traffic and vehicle design, etc. In this show, the organizer successfully provided visitors and exhibitors with an opportunity for business talks in addition to the general promotion of automobiles.

1958 

It was held from October 10 to October 20, 1958.

For the Fifth Motor Show, the venue was changed to the infield space of Korakuen Bicycle Race Stadium due to construction at Hibiya Park. The time period of the show was also shifted to commence from October 10. The motor show hereafter opens as an autumn event organized by the Japan Motor Industrial Federation, Inc. In the fifth show, a Technical Center (sponsored by the Society of Automotive Engineering) was created to promote technical developments of made-in-Japan automobiles, as well as a new Meeting Place for business talks. An automobile information room was also provided near the main entrance of the venue. More than 300 people visited the center per day.

Although some newspapers were critical, saying that a Japanese car for the common people had not yet been produced this year either, a newly released Subaru 360 was very popular at the national event. Other vehicles which aroused interest included the Mikasa Touring 600cc engine car equipped with a torque converter, and the Crown 1,500cc diesel engine model.

1959 
The 1959 show opened on October 24 and ran until November 4, 1959. Notable premieres included Mitsubishi's first own passenger car, the Mitsubishi 500.

The Japan Trade Center (indoor exhibition hall), located in Harumi, was newly chosen as the venue for the Sixth Motor Show. The total area of the site was nearly three times that of Hibiya, while the exhibiting space was double that of Hibiya site. The admission fee, which comes with the lottery tickets, also was raised to 50 yen per person. 

The number of exhibited vehicles expanded to 317 units in this year's show. In the passenger car category, Japanese automakers displayed attractive models, including the Subaru 360, Mitsubishi 500, Datsun Sports 211, and the all-new Bluebird. Toyota also presented its Mater Line equipped with Japan's first automatic transmission. The Prince Skyline featured a 1,500cc engine with a maximum output of 70 horse-power. In the truck category, The Nissan Datsun Truck G220 and many 3-wheeler models were highlighted.

1960s

1960 
It was held from October 25 to November 7, 1960.

1961 
It was held from October 25 to November 7, 1961.

The "brilliant" Eighth Motor Show featured various sports cars and prototypes. The exhibiting area was double the space of the previous show and a South Gate was newly added. An extended exhibition time (through 8 p.m.) was introduced on two days of this year's show. The total number of visitors surpassed 900,000. The Japanese government announced the "Income Doubling Plan" at the year-end of the previous year, and individual spending gradually increased. The so-called "3-C Period" was approaching the general public. People's dreams were to have a car, color TV and air-conditioner. Buoyed by the upturned economy, the star models were presented at the Motor Show. Many international products were also showcased. They were the Prince Skyline Sports Convertible designed by Michelotti, the Nissan Fairlady prototype, the Italian-style Toyopet Sports X, and the Daihatsu 700cc engine car.

1962 
It was held from October 25 to November 7, 1962.

The highlight of this year's Motor Show was Honda's first automobile. The company has already earned a world-class reputation in motorcycle races such as the World Grand Prix, and unveiled its two models on the stage: The Honda Sports 360 and 500. This helped the event attract one million and more visitors for the first time. The street from Ginza to the Harumi venue was congested with more than 10,000 cars going to the motor show every day and the organizer was forced to change it to a one-way street. At the same time, maritime transport was introduced between Takeshiba Pier and Harumi. The exhibiting areas were extended to accommodate a total of 410 vehicles. A Technical Center also debuted in an out-door area at the show hosted by the Japan Automotive Service Equipment Association and others.

1963 

It was held from October 26 to November 10, 1963.

"To respond to the coming liberalization of automobile import, Japanese carmakers displayed an array of new cars," newspapers reported in regard to the Tenth Motor Show. As part of the 10th anniversary program, the admission fee for the first day of the show was set at 500 yen (100 yen fee plus 400 yen donation for the Community Chest Center). 

From this year's show, two halls were provided for passenger car exhibits to help passenger cars become the stars of the motor show. A test driving course was created in the south of the exhibition area, which became very popular among visitors. This suggested that the show should include "an experience-oriented event." Many cars designed by foreign car designers were also displayed at the show. Notably, Toyo Kogyo (former Mazda Motor Corp.) unveiled its rotary engine series, which the company reportedly had a hard time to develop. The company's advanced sports car fitted with the rotary engine was finally on the stage.

1964 
It was held from September 26 to October 9, 1964.

The Nissan Fairlady 1500 (Datsun Sports 1500, SR310) and the Mazda Cosmo were introduced at this show, one month before the 1964 Summer Olympics.

Seeing market growth due to the liberalization of automobile import to be introduced in April next year, three foreign carmakers newly participated in the motor show this year. With this international move, the motor show was renamed from the All-Japan Motor Show to the Tokyo Motor Show. A press room was also created for foreign and domestic media. This year's show featured many GT and Coupe models rather than conventional 4-door sedans, which reflected the desire for sporty cars in the minds of consumers. Toyota's third-generation Corona RT40 was also displayed at the show. The Corona series and its long-time rival, Nissan's Bluebird, through their side-by-side competition in the so-called "B-C Battle" in the market, have long played a key role in the development of Japan's motorization.

 Datsun Coupe 1500
 Mazda Cosmo prototype

1965 
It was held from October 29 to November 11, 1965.

A feeling that the time of high economic growth had come was in the air. The 12th Tokyo Motor Show was held immediately after the October 1 introduction of the automobile import liberalization. For this year's motor show, Japanese carmakers thus emphasized sales promotion rather than presenting showy exhibits. To cope with imported automobiles, luxury Japanese models were on display, including the President fitted with a V8 4,000cc engine, the New Cedric, and Crown V8 engine model which was previously showcased at last year's show. In the small car category, a variety of new models were unveiled in the 800-1,000cc engine class, including Japan's first fastback model, the Colt 800, the Honda S800/N800, Subaru 1000, and Familia Coupe 1000. My Cars (One's own cars), which were not used for taxi models, were also highlighted at the show.

1966 
It was held from October 26 to November 8, 1966.

The 13th Tokyo Motor Show was held in 1966, the year of "The first year of My Car (one's own car)." As the driving force of the development of Japan's motorization, the Nissan Sunny and Toyota Corolla were unveiled at this year's show. Other carmakers also presented their new models in the 800-1,000cc engine class, heralding the "Era of Cars for Everyone." Amid the My Car boom, minivehicles fitted with under 660cc engines also earned popularity among consumers again. New minivehicle models such as Honda's N360, the Daihatsu Fellow, and Suzuki Fronte featured significantly improved performance, resulting in a strong presence among owners of conventional minivehicles. Notably, the Nissan Prince Royal, the first made-in-Japan limousine used by the emperor and empress, was unveiled at the show. Visitors were surprised at the vehicle's overwhelming body size and engine.

 Honda L800

1967 
It was held from October 26 to November 8, 1967.

The 14th Tokyo Motor Show provided an opportunity for promoting traffic safety to society. A "Traffic Safety Corner" was created on the second floor of the 8th Hall (space for passenger cars) to allow visitors to experience tests. At the 2nd Hall, another promotion was conducted concerning the importance of the helmet. Although the number of exhibited vehicles slightly decreased to 655 units, compared to the previous year, attractive vehicles were on display. Toyota's Century, fitted with a V8-cylinder 3,000cc engine, was introduced as the company's flagship model. Nissan also unveiled its Bluebird 510. The vehicle features unique exterior design without triangle windows as well as a new independent 4-wheel suspension, which also became a popular model in the U.S. later. Toyo Kogyo displayed its rotary engine cars, the RX87 and RX85, as reference models.

1968 

It was held from October 26 to November 11, 1968.

Japanese carmakers experienced industry-wide reorganization this year. Nissan, after the merger with Prince in 1966, announced a business tie-up with Fuji Heavy Industries. Toyota also formed a business alliance with Hino and Daihatsu. With this alliance, Hino stopped producing its Contessa passenger car and Hino vehicles vanished in the passenger car halls of the Tokyo Motor Show. As traffic safety and air-pollution became serious problems this year, the organizer provided a Safety Science Center in the 5th Hall at the motor show to promote seatbelts (with demonstration) and control of idling. A "Traffic Safety Room for Children" was also created for the first time. Among the exhibits, Toyota's Crown Hardtop (2-door model) and Corona Mark II (1600 and 1900) were the center of attraction. Other vehicles of interest included the Nissan Laurel, Skyline 2000GT powered by a V6 engine, Isuzu 117 Coupe, and Toyota's Sprinter Coupe.

 Nissan Skyline GT-R (first generation)

1969 
It was held from October 24 to November 6, 1969.

The Tomei Expressway opened in March this year and the demand for high-speed driving was growing rapidly in Japan. Significant progress was seen in the performance of Japanese vehicles. The 16th Tokyo Motor Show was highlighted by an array of sports cars and vehicles for motor sports. At the same time, many show models were displayed in the futuristic "dream cars" and commuter model categories, which were developed under the key concepts of high-speed and safety. Notably, the president of the motor show Prince Takamatsu showed particular interest in such future cars displayed on the stages as Toyota's EX-I, II and III. Meanwhile, carmakers emphasized displays of technological developments at the show in response to recall problems reported in June this year. They also aggressively promoted countermeasures for some serious social issues: traffic safety and the prevention of air-pollution.

 Isuzu Bellett MX1600 concept
 Mitsubishi Galant GTO

1970s

1970 
It was held from October 30 to November 12, 1970.

Imported automobiles participated in the 17th Tokyo Motor Show for the first time. A total of 95 imported vehicles were exhibited by 33 foreign carmakers from 7 countries. The latest designs and advanced technologies of imported vehicles helped the Japan show to have a strong international flavor. On the other hand, Japanese carmakers presented a variety of vehicles ranging from sporty models (including minivehicles) prepared for high-speed driving, cars for leisure use and city cars, as well as advanced reference models (including electric vehicles) focusing on high safety standards and low exhaust emissions. This year Toyota released the Celica and Carina onto the market, while Nissan launched its front-engine, front-wheel-drive model, the Cherry, featuring an industry-first horizontally mounted engine layout. A "Safety and Pollution Protection Center" pavilion was newly created at the show to indicate that the automotive industry has launched into the challenge to improve safety and reduce exhaust emissions.

Mazda RX-500 concept
Toyota Celica (First generation)
Toyota EX-7 concept
Toyota Electronics Car concept

1971 
The 18th Tokyo Motor Show, the second international motor show, attracted many more visitors from overseas countries than the previous year when capital transaction was liberalized in Japan's automotive sector in April this year. Exhibits of carmakers this year also focused on the challenges and solutions for safety and low-emission vehicles to respond to increasing concerns of traffic safety, air-pollution, and traffic jams in society. As for commercial vehicles, approval for exhibition was given to the under 3-ton class and a part of special-purpose vehicles only, which resulted in a passenger car oriented show this year.  It was held from October 29 to November 11, 1971.

 Toyota SV-1 prototype
 Toyota Marinetta concept
 Toyota RV-1 concept

1972 

The main focus of this year's show was the technological developments of safety vehicles and emission reduction, which were also the primary targets to be addressed. It was held from October 23 to November 5, 1972.

The main focus of this year's show was the technological developments of safety vehicles and emission reduction, which were also the primary targets to be addressed. The auto industry's challenging positions were highlighted throughout the show. To support this, a "Safety and Pollution Prevention Corner" was set up in the 1st Hall, while large commercial vehicles were eliminated from the exhibits again. Carmakers presented the latest technologies of low-emission vehicles, including the oxide catalyst (the three way catalyst was not available at that time) and Honda's CVCC engine, as well as Thermal Reactor technology developed by Mazda and Daihatsu. Meanwhile, visitors paid great attention to motor sport oriented cars such as a racecar specification model of the Nissan Skyline and Mazda Savanna RX-3. A lunar surface vehicle, developed jointly by Isuzu and GM, was also one of the star attraction.

 Mazda Chantez EV concept
 Nissan Skyline GT-R (Second generation)
 Datsun Sunny RE Prototype
 Toyota RV-2 concept
 Toyota ESV-2 concept

1973 
To commemorate the 20th anniversary, the organizer prepared special events for the Tokyo Motor Show this year. They were the "Development of Vehicles," an easy explanation display of how vehicles have progressed, and "Man and Automobiles," a review of the role of automobiles in society.  It was held from October 30 to November 12, 1973.
Daihatsu EV1
Toyota ESV concept
Toyota Marinetta 10 trailer concept

1975 
It was held from October 31 to November 10, 1975.

The 21st Tokyo Motor Show, the first event after it changed to an every-other-year cycle, was held under the theme of "Life on Wheels" to present the auto industry's clear visions and attitude toward environmental issues. The Theme Pavilion put on various displays to show the broad connection of daily life and automobiles, as well as the auto industry's contribution (as an export business) to the Japanese economy. A very rare presentation was also seen to show the various relationships between life and vehicles in the earlier days through such old vehicles as the 1918 "Detroit" electric vehicle and the 1929 Sumida bus. On the other hand, carmakers displayed the latest developments in environmental technology in order to comply with emission regulations. Toyota displayed the TTC-c/TTC-V system, while Nissan exhibited the NAPS system. The duration was shortened by 3 days to 11 days compared with the previous show. The exhibiting areas were also reduced to 5 Halls, which resulted in a reduction of visitors to the below-one-million-level for the first time since the 9th motor show.

 Toyota Century GT45 concept
 Toyota MP-1 concept

1977 
It was held from October 28 to November 7, 1977.

This year's show saw a rush of new model releases of Japanese vehicles, which have succeeded in meeting exhaust emission regulations. The key slogan of the industry has changed from "low-emission" to "fuel saving." Star models included: Daihatsu Charade, fitted with the world's first 4-cycle 3-cylinder engine, which achieved a fuel economy of 19km-per-liter; as well as "fuel-saving" diesel-powered passenger cars such as the Nissan Cedric, Toyota Crown, and Isuzu Florian. This year Japan became the world's No.1 vehicle exporter, fueled by the boom of small cars due to the oil crisis. There was also a sign of an outbreak of trade conflict between Japan and Europe/America. Foreign brand vehicles thus were on display in a separate hall from Japanese vehicles at the motor show this year. The latest models occupied the foreign car hall, attracting many car enthusiasts. This helped the motor show to have a strong international flavor.

 Toyota CAL-1 concept

1979 

The theme was "Abundance Towards the 80s --Vehicles Connecting the World". It was held from November 1 to November 12, 1979.

Under the theme of "Abundance Towards the 80s --Vehicles Connecting the World--," the last motor show in the 70s was colored with aggressive visions toward the next decade. Despite the tough challenges of energy saving, carmakers actively presented new technologies at the 23rd Tokyo motor show. The highlighted vehicles were mostly equipped with turbo engines or diesel engines. At the Theme Hall, under the banner of "Japanese Engine Technologies," a total of 77 engines and cut-away models were displayed, ranging from aircraft engines used in World War II to rocket engines for spaceships. The organizer paid a great deal of attention to foreign carmakers due to growing concerns of trade conflict. This was reflected in the number of exhibits at the show. Exhibited foreign passenger cars numbered 123, 27 units more than the previous show. Foreign cars were grouped by country.

 Isuzu Piazza
 Toyota Sports 800 Gas Turbine Hybrid concept
 Toyota CX-80 (FCX-80) concept
 Toyota Family Wagon concept

1980s

1981 

This year's event was held from October 30 to November 10, 1981.

The world was struggling with low economic growth and instability. Carmakers, however, displayed an array of new models, reference models, and new technologies, making the motor show much more active. A notable trend was the front-engine, front-wheel-drive (FF) layout for small cars, the lightweight body of which mated with excellent aerodynamic features and helped the small car to achieve a high level of fuel efficiency. The turbo charger was also a highlight of the motor show. Nissan pioneered the installation of the turbo engine in the vehicle lineup, while Mitsubishi Motors set up turbo engine versions in a full-scale lineup this year. Even for a 1-liter engine car, Daihatsu Charade, a turbo version, the Charade Detomaso Turbo was displayed as a reference model at this year's motor show. Meanwhile, recreational vehicles (RVs) have increased in the market in terms of both number and type. Automobiles were increasingly becoming diverse as users wanted various functions in the car. The number of exhibited vehicles was 849 units, a record-high, while the number of visitors rose to 1,114,200 people.

 Suzuki CV1
 Toyota DV-1 
 Toyota EX-11
 Toyota SV-2

1983

The theme was "Vehicles: Past, Present, and Future".  It was held from October 28 to November 8, 1983.

Amid the world economy facing hard times over the years, Japanese domestic demand was also sluggish. Exhibitors at the Tokyo Motor Show this year, however, presented abundant displays of prototypes and reference models to visitors. These vehicles adopted new technologies which were soon to be used in production vehicles. Proactive proposals for near-future vehicles were also found in such exhibits. Exhibited foreign passenger cars increased by 50% compared with the previous motor show. Foreign exhibitors numbered 28 companies. Combined number of exhibited vehicles with Japanese vehicles totaled 945 units, an all-time high. The number of visitors reached 1,204,000 people, including 26,625 foreign visitors. In commemoration of the motor show's 25th anniversary, the Theme Hall featured "Vehicles: Past, Present, and Future." The special showcase provided displays and easy explanations of the possibility of technologies in vehicle development, as well as how the present high technologies have been developed, and how new materials and electronics would be utilized in future technology.

 Toyota FX-1
 Toyota SV-3
 Toyota TAC3

1985
The theme was "The Culture of Motoring: The New Generation of Vehicles".  It was held from October 31 to November 11, 1985.
Nissan MID4
Toyota AXV
Toyota FXV

1987
It was held from October 29 to November 9, 1987.
Nissan MID4-II
Toyota AXV-II
Toyota EV-30
Toyota FXV-II
Toyota GTV

1989
The theme was "Freedom of Mobility - A Taste of Real Life and Luxury". It was held from October 26 to November 6, 1989.

Aston Martin Virage
Mazda AZ-550 Sports (Type A, B and C)
Ferrari 348
Ferrari Mythos concept
Honda NSX
Jiotto Caspita
Lotus Elan
Mazda Carol
Mitsubishi GTO
Mitsubishi HSR-II
Nissan Figaro
Nissan S-Cargo
Porsche Panamericana
Suzuki Cappuccino
Subaru Alcyone SVX
Toyota MR2
Toyota Previa

1990s

1991
The theme was "Discovering a New Relationship: People, Cars and the Earth as One". It was held from October 25 to November 8, 1991.

Toyota AXV-III concept
Toyota AXV-IV concept
Toyota Avalon (Concept)
Toyota Fun Runner concept

1993
The theme was "Car Innovation in Free, Natural and Comfortable Ways". It was held from October 22 to November 5, 1993.
Ford Mustang
Nissan Skyline GT-R (R33)
Suzuki Wagon R (first generation)
Toyota AXV-V concept
Toyota EV-50 prototype
Toyota Mega Cruiser prototype
Toyota Raum concept
Toyota Raum-II concept

1995
The theme was "Dream the Dream, a Car with That Feel". It was held from October 27 to November 8, 1995.
Honda S2000 concept
Subaru Streega concept
Toyota FLV concept
Toyota Fun Runner II concept
Toyota Hybrid Electric Bus concept
Toyota Moguls concept
Toyota MRJ concept
Toyota Prius

1997
The theme was "One World. One People. One Show". It was held from October 24 to November 5, 1997.
BMW Z07 concept
Honda J-MW concept
Mercedes-Benz Maybach concept
Toyota FCEV
Toyota Funcargo concept
Toyota Funcoupe concept
Toyota Funtime concept
Toyota NC250
Volkswagen W12 Syncro

1999
The theme was "Eye to the future. Changing vehicles for the earth". It was held from October 22 to November 3, 1999.
Bugatti EB18/4 concept
Daihatsu EZ-U concept
Daihatsu Micros concept
Daihatsu Naked
Daihatsu SP-4 concept
Ford 021C concept
Honda Spocket concept
Toyota Celica Cruising Deck concept
Toyota HV-M4 concept
Toyota NCSV concept
Toyota Opa prototype
Toyota Open Deck concept
Toyota Origin
Toyota WiLL Vi

2000s

2000
The theme was "Vehicle of Character Across the World, Building Our Future". It was held from October 31 to November 4, 2000.

2001
The theme was "Open the Door! The Automobile's Bright Future". It was held from October 26 to November 7, 2001.

The 2001 show saw the following introductions:

Daihatsu Muse
Daihatsu Copen
Daihatsu FF Ultra
Honda Bulldog concept
Honda Unibox concept
Hyundai TB Concept Car
Isuzu Zen concept
Mazda RX-8
Mazda Secret Hideout concept
Mercedes F400 Carving concept
Mini Cooper S
Mitsubishi CZ2 concept
Mitsubishi CZ3 concept
Mitsubishi Spaceliner concept
Mitsubishi SUP concept
Nissan GT-R Concept
Nissan mm
Nissan Fairlady Z Z33
Nissan Ideo concept
Nissan Kino concept
Nissan Nails concept
Toyota DMT
Toyota FXS concept
Toyota Pod concept
Toyota Will VC
Volkswagen W12

2002
The theme was "Sense the Evolution - Commercial Vehicles on Stage". It was held from October 29 to November 3, 2002.

2003
The theme was "The Challenge: Driving Toward A Better Future". It was held from October 24 to November 5, 2003.

 Toyota CS&S concept
Toyota Fine-N concept
 Toyota NLSV concept
Toyota PM concept
Toyota SU-HV1 concept

2004
The theme was "Vehicles for People. Vehicles as Partner". It was held from November 2 to November 7, 2004.

 Toyota Hiace Sound Satellite concept
 Toyota Regius Ace My Kart Factory
 Toyota Welcab concept

2005

The theme was "Driving Tomorrow!' from Tokyo". It was held from October 21 to November 6, 2005.

The 2005 show saw the following introductions:

Audi Shooting Brake
Bugatti Veyron
Chrysler Akino
Daihatsu Costa
Daihatsu UFE-III
Ferrari GG50
Honda FCX
Honda Sports4
Honda WOW
Hyundai Neos-3
Lexus LF-Sh
Mercedes-Benz F600
Mini Concept Tokyo
Mitsubishi Concept D:5
Mitsubishi i
Nissan Amenio
Nissan Foria
Nissan Note Adidas
Nissan Pivo
Nissan GT-R Proto
Subaru B5-TPH
Suzuki Ionis
Suzuki LC
Suzuki PX
Toyota Estima
Toyota Fine-X
Toyota FSC
Toyota i-swing
Volkswagen EcoRacer

2007
The theme was "Catch the News, Touch the Future". It began on Friday, October 26 and ran for 17 days.

The 2007 show saw the following introductions:

 Honda CR-Z concept
 Honda Inspire
 Mitsubishi Lancer Evolution X
 Nissan GT-R
 Nissan X-Trail
 Subaru Impreza WRX STI (GR chassis)
Suzuki Pixy + SSC concept
Toyota Hi-CT concept
Toyota RiN concept
Toyota 1/X concept
 Yamaha Tesseract concept

Alternative propulsion
Hybrid and electric vehicles dominated the 2007 Tokyo Motor Show.

Concepts for new hybrids, plug-in hybrids, electric vehicles from Japan's leading automakers are now on display at the Tokyo Motor Show. As one example, Toyota Motor Corporation introduced its 1/X (pronounced "one-Xth") concept vehicle, a Prius-like sedan that tips the scales at a third of the weight of the Prius and obtains double the Prius' fuel economy. The vehicle cuts its weight by using carbon-fiber-reinforced plastic in its frame and boosts its fuel economy with a small plug-in hybrid powertrain that can be fueled with either gasoline or E85, a blend of 85% ethanol and 15% gasoline. Toyota's other plug-in hybrid concept, the Hi-CT, is a small, boxy, two-door vehicle aimed at young car buyers. In addition, Toyota's luxury brand, Lexus, introduced its next-generation hybrid sport utility vehicle, the LF-Xh, an all-wheel-drive vehicle powered by a V6 engine teamed up with a high-output electric motor.

General Motors, Ford, Chrysler and Hyundai did not attend the show.

Among the other automakers, Honda Motor Company, Ltd., unveiled the CR-Z, a "next-generation lightweight sports car" that features Honda's hybrid electric drivetrain, and the PUYO, another small, boxy vehicle, powered by a fuel cell. Honda will also unveil the one-wheeled scooter transport, the Honda U3-X.

Mitsubishi Motors Corporation introduced a Beetle-like electric vehicle with in-wheel electric motors, called the i MiEV Sport, which even has a solar panel on its roof. Nissan unveiled the Pivo 2, a small electric vehicle with a lithium-ion battery pack and wheel motors.

But Japanese automakers weren't the only ones unveiling clean car concepts in Tokyo. Audi arrived with its "Metroproject Quattro," a plug-in hybrid with a direct-injection, turbocharged,  gasoline engine mounted up front and a 30-kilowatt motor on its rear axle. The concept vehicle employs a lithium-ion battery pack that allows it to run on electric power only.

2009

It was held from Oct. 23 (Fri.) - Nov. 4 (Wed.), 2009.

The following were introduced at the 2009 show:

 Honda CR-Z pre-production concept
 Honda EV-N concept
 Honda Skydeck concept
 Honda VFR1200F motorcycle
 2010 Honda Stepwgn
 Lexus LFA
 Lotus Exige Scura/Stealth
 Mitsubishi i MiEV Cargo
 2011 Nissan Fuga
 Nissan Land Glider concept
 Nissan Leaf
 2010 Volkswagen Polo GTI
 Nissan Roox
 Subaru Exiga 2.0T STI
 Subaru Hybrid Tourer concept
 Subaru Impreza WRX STI Carbon
 Suzuki Swift Plug-in Hybrid concept
 Toyota FT-86 Concept
 Toyota FT-EV II concept
 Toyota Prius Plug-In Hybrid Concept

2010s

2011
The theme was "Mobility can change the world."  It was held from Dec. 2 (Fri.) - Dec. 11 (Sun.), 2011.

 Audi A1 Sportback
 BMW ActiveHybrid 5
 BMW Alpina B3 GT3
 BMW Alpina B6 BiTurbo Coupé
 Honda AC-X
 Honda EV Ster
 Honda Micro Commuter Concept
 Honda N-Box
 Honda RC-E
 Lexus GS450h
 Mazda Takeri
 Nissan Pivo 3
 Subaru BRZ
 Toyota 86
 Toyota FCV-R concept
 Toyota Fun-Vii
 Toyota FT-EV III
 Toyota Aqua
 Volkswagen Cross Coupe
 Volkswagen Passat Alltrack

2013

The theme was "Compete! And shape a new future."  It was held from Nov. 22 (Fri.) - Dec. 1 (Sun.), 2013.
Alpina B4
BMW 4 Series Convertible (F33)
Honda S660 prototype
Subaru Cross Sport Design Concept
Toyota FT-86 Open Concept
Toyota JPN Taxi Concept
Yamaha Tricity

2015
The theme was “Your heart will race.” It was held from October 29 (Thu.) - November 8 (Sun.), 2015.

 Daihatsu D-Base concept
 Daihatsu Hinata concept
 Daihatsu Noriori concept
 Daihatsu Tempo concept
 Porsche Macan GTS
 Toyota FCV Plus concept
 Toyota S-FR concept
 Toyota Kikai concept

2017 
The theme was "Beyond the motor". It was held from October 27 (Fri.) - November 5 (Sun.), 2017.

 Daihatsu Cast Activa
 Daihatsu Cast Style
 Daihatsu DN Compagno
 Daihatsu DN Multisix
 Daihatsu DN Pro Cargo
 Daihatsu DN Trec
 Daihatsu DN U-Space
 E-Fuso Vision One
 Honda Clarity Plug-In Hybrid
 Honda Legend Hybrid
 Honda Odyssey Absolute Hybrid
 Honda S660 "Special β #komorebi edition"
 Honda Sports EV Concept
 Lexus GS F "F 10th Anniversary Limited 500"
 Lexus LS+ Concept
 Lexus RC F "F 10th Anniversary Limited 500"
 Mazda Kai Concept
 Mazda Vision Coupé Concept
 Mitsubishi Eclipse Cross
 Mitsubishi eK Custom "Active Gear"
 Mitsubishi eK Space "Active Gear"
 Mitsubishi e-Evolution Concept
 Nissan e-NV200 Fridge Concept
 Nissan IMx Concept
 Nissan Leaf Nismo Concept
 Nissan NV350 Paramedic Concept
 Nissan Serena e-Power Highway Star
 Nissan Serena Nismo
 Nissan Skyline Hybrid
 Subaru BRZ STI Sport
 Subaru WRX STI S208
 Subaru VIZIZ Performance Concept
 Suzuki Carry Open-Air Market Concept
 Suzuki e-Survivor Concept
 Suzuki Spacia Concept
 Suzuki Spacia Custom Concept
 Suzuki Xbee Concept
 Suzuki Xbee Outdoor Adventure Concept
 Suzuki Xbee Street Adventure Concept
 Toyota Century (G60)
 Toyota Concept-愛i Ride
 Toyota Crown Concept
 Toyota Fine-Comfort Ride Concept
 Toyota GR HV Sports Concept
 Toyota JPN Taxi
 Toyota Sora Fuel Cell Bus
 Toyota Tj Cruiser Concept
 Yamaha Cross Hub Concept
 Yamaha Motobot Ver.2 Concept
 Yamaha Motoroid Concept
 Yamaha MWC-4 Concept
 Yamaha Niken
 Zagato Iso Rivolta Vision Gran Turismo

2019 
The theme is "Open Future". It is held from October 24 (Thu.) - November 4 (Mon.), 2019.

 Daihatsu IcoIco
 Daihatsu Rocky
 Daihatsu TsumuTsumu
 Daihatsu Waiwai
 Daihatsu WakuWaku
 Honda e
 Honda Fit
 Lexus LF-30 Electrified
 Mazda MX-30
 Mitsubishi ASX
 Mitsubishi MI-TECH Concept
 Mitsubishi Super Height K-Wagon Concept
 Nissan Ariya Concept
 Nissan IMk Concept
 Subaru Levorg Prototype
 Suzuki Hustler concept
 Suzuki WAKU Spo
 Suzuki Hanare
 Toyota LQ Concept
 Toyota Mirai Concept
 Toyota Ultra-Compact BEV

2020s

2021
Due to the COVID-19 pandemic in Tokyo, the 2021 Tokyo Motor Show was cancelled. It is the first time the show was not held as scheduled since it started in 1954.

2023
In 2022, based on increased attendance at the 2019 TMS, JAMA announced the next event would not focus exclusively on automobiles and proposed a rebranding to Japan All-Industry Show. For 2023, the event is now the Japan Mobility Show, which will be held from October 26 to November 5.

References

External links

Official Tokyo Motor Show website
Girls of the 2007 Tokyo Motor Show
2007 Tokyo Motorcycle Show Coverage  at [CycleWorld.com]

Auto shows in Japan
Motorcycle shows
Tourist attractions in Chiba Prefecture
Autumn events in Japan
Automotive industry in Japan
Recurring events established in 1954
1954 establishments in Japan
Biennial events